Fabrizio Massimo Bramati (born 12 June 1993) is an Italian footballer who plays for  club Grosseto.

Biography
Bramati started his football career in Lazio region. He was a player for Isola Liri under-17 team in 2009–10 season and Lazio under-15 team in 2007–08 season. In 2008–09 season Bramati left for Siena's under-16–17 team, a Tuscan team.

He was signed by Tuscan team Grosseto in summer 2010, after he was released by Isola Liri on 16 July 2010; However, he was released again ca. summer 2010. Bramati became a player of amateur team A.C.D. Guidonia Montecelio. Bramati played twice for the Lazio-based team in 2010–11 Serie D, on 19 December and 5 January.

On 19 January 2011 Bramati was signed by Crotone in temporary deal. In August 2011 Crotone signed him outright. He spent the whole Crotone career with the reserve team.

Cesena
In June 2012 half of the registration rights of Bramati was exchanged with half of the "card" of Mattia Stefanelli of Cesena. Both 50% rights were tagged for €300,000. In 2011–12 financial year Cesena had a player selling profit of €18,694,666, despite almost half of them came from player swap in June 2012. (Profits: Rossini €2.9M; Ferri €2.4M; Del Pivo €2M; Stefanelli €600,000) Bramati signed a 3-year contract. He failed to play any game in the first half of 2012–13 Serie B. He was too old for the reserve (league committee lowered the age limit) nor able to break into the first team. On 5 January 2013 Bramati left for Savona. Bramati played his only match on 12 May, the last competitive game of the season. In June 2013 the co-ownership deals were renewed.

On 2 September Bramati joined Chieti. On 4 January 2014 Bramati completed the transfer to Associazione Calcio Bellaria – Igea Marina, rejoining Cesena teammate Del Pivo.

Savona
On 8 August 2014 he was signed by Savona.

Paganese
On 2 August 2019 he signed with Paganese.

References

External links
 AIC profile (data by www.football.it) 
 

1993 births
Footballers from Rome
Living people
Italian footballers
Association football midfielders
S.S. Lazio players
A.C.N. Siena 1904 players
A.C. Isola Liri players
F.C. Grosseto S.S.D. players
F.C. Crotone players
A.C. Cesena players
Savona F.B.C. players
S.S. Chieti Calcio players
A.C. Bellaria Igea Marina players
A.C.R. Messina players
S.S. Akragas Città dei Templi players
Senglea Athletic F.C. players
Paganese Calcio 1926 players
S.S.D. F.C. Messina players
Serie C players
Serie D players
Maltese Premier League players
Italian expatriate footballers
Expatriate footballers in Malta
Italian expatriate sportspeople in Malta